Floyd Green is a Jamaican politician from the Labour Party. He has been Member of Parliament for Saint Elizabeth South Western since 2016.

Education 
He graduated from Munro College and the University of the West Indies.

Political career 
In September 2021, he resigned as Minister of Agriculture and Fisheries after being filmed at a social gathering during COVID-19 lockdown in breach of public health restrictions.

In December 2022, he called for increased support for local police after a number of murders in his constituency.

References 

Living people
21st-century Jamaican politicians
People educated at Munro College
University of the West Indies alumni
Fisheries ministers of Jamaica
Ministers of Agriculture of Jamaica
Members of the House of Representatives of Jamaica
Jamaica Labour Party politicians
People from Saint Elizabeth Parish
Year of birth missing (living people)
Members of the 13th Parliament of Jamaica
Members of the 14th Parliament of Jamaica